Demons Down is the third studio album by House of Lords, released on April 7, 1992.

It was recorded with founding members James Christian and Gregg Giuffria playing with a reformed band line-up, and was the last album before the band's breakup the same year. A poster of the album cover was featured in the Seinfeld episode "The Bubble Boy".

Track listing

Personnel
James Christian - lead vocals
Gregg Giuffria - keyboards, backing vocals
Dennis Chick - guitars, backing vocals
Sean McNabb - bass, backing vocals
Tommy Aldridge - drums, backing vocals

Additional musicians
Paul Stanley - backing vocals on "Can’t Fight Love"
Tim Pierce - guitar
Danny Jacobs - guitar
David Glen Eisley - backing vocals
Billy Trudel - backing vocals

References

External links
Kiss-Related-Recordings
Sleaze Roxx
[ Billboard.com]

1992 albums
House of Lords (band) albums